Edward Stacey "Tedd" Pierce III (August 12, 1906 – February 19, 1972) was an American screenwriter and voice actor of animated cartoons, principally from the mid-1930s to the late 1950s.

Biography 
Pierce was the son of a stockbroker, Samuel Cuppels Pierce, who in turn was the son of Edward S. Pierce, a long-serving treasurer of the St. Louis-based Samuel Cuppels Woodenware Company.  Pierce completed his education through the fourth year of high school, according to the 1940 census records.

Pierce spent the majority of his career as a writer for the Warner Bros. "Termite Terrace" animation studio, whose other notable alumni include Chuck Jones and Michael Maltese. Pierce also worked as a writer at Fleischer Studios from 1939 to 1941. Jones credited Pierce in his autobiography Chuck Amuck: The Life and Times of an Animated Cartoonist (1989) as being the inspiration for the character Pepé Le Pew, the haplessly romantic French skunk due to Pierce's self-proclamation that he was a ladies' man. He had one son, named Geoffrey Pierce, from a formal marriage.

In early credits, his name was spelled "T-E-D". He was said to have added an extra "D" to his name as a way of lampooning puppeteer Bil Baird when he dropped one of the "L"s from his first name.

He contributed (with Bill Danch) the story of the Tom and Jerry short Tall in the Trap (1962), directed by Gene Deitch. 

In his Warners career, Pierce worked with three of the three best-known Warner animation directors (Jones, McKimson and Friz Freleng). He contributed many storylines for them, including Freleng's Hare Do (1949), Bad Ol' Putty Tat (1949), Bunker Hill Bunny (1950) and Big House Bunny (1950); Jones' Hare Tonic (1945, an early success for both of them) and Broom-Stick Bunny (1956); and McKimson's Hillbilly Hare (1950), Lovelorn Leghorn (1951) and Cat-Tails for Two (1953), the last of which was Speedy Gonzales' first appearance. Because much of Pierce's Termite Terrace career was spent with McKimson's unit, however, it would follow that Pierce was generally overshadowed by his contemporaries as story writers at Warners, Warren Foster and Michael Maltese.

Pierce also got occasional voice work in the shorts: he gave voice to the tough guy in Into Your Dance (1935), Jack Bunny in I Love to Singa (1936), King Bombo in  Gulliver's Travels (1939), and the villainous C. Bagley Beetle in Mr. Bug Goes to Town (1941), in addition to writing on those films.

He imitated Bud Abbott in one Warner short casting Abbott and Costello as alley cats Babbit and Catstello (A Tale of Two Kitties) and two Warner shorts casting them as mice (Tale of Two Mice and The Mouse-Merized Cat). Pierce also voiced Tom Dover in The Dover Boys, the "tall, thin" character in Wackiki Wabbit, and the French chef Louis in French Rarebit. In addition, in a few shorts containing Jones' Hubie and Bertie characters, Pierce voiced Hubie, and Maltese played Bertie. Thereafter they were voiced by the principal voice actor, Mel Blanc, and Stan Freberg, who had also voiced secondary Looney Tunes/Merrie Melodies duos such as the Goofy Gophers and Spike the Bulldog and Chester the Terrier.

While it has been speculated that Pierce did voice-work for coming-attractions trailers for Universal Studios, experts in the voice acting field such as Keith Scott have disputed this point.

Filmography

References

External links 
 
 

1906 births
1972 deaths
20th-century American male actors
20th-century American male writers
20th-century American screenwriters
American male screenwriters
American male voice actors
Animation screenwriters
Animators from New York (state)
Fleischer Studios people
Warner Bros. Cartoons people
Warner Bros. Cartoons voice actors
Walter Lantz Productions people